The Thin Red Line is the debut album by Canadian band Glass Tiger.

The album is most famous for the single "Don't Forget Me (When I'm Gone)". The song, which featured backup vocals by Bryan Adams, reached #1 on the Canadian charts and #2 in the United States. A follow-up single, "Someday", was also successful, reaching #7 in the U.S. and #14 in Canada.

Critical reaction
Both Greg Burliuk of the Kingston Whig-Standard and Evelyn Erskine of the Ottawa Citizen compared the album to Duran Duran. Erskine dismissed the album and opined that the band "has yet to find its own musical direction", while Burliuk called the album uneven but praised the singles "Don't Forget Me", "Someday" and "You're What I Look For".

Chart performance

The album was certified quadruple platinum in Canada and went gold in the U.S.

It debuted on the RPM100 album charts in RPM the week of March 1, 1986, and peaked at #3 on the charts in the week of April 26. It remained in the top 100 for 67 weeks overall, concluding its chart run in the week of July 20, 1987. In the magazine's year-end charts, it placed as the 16th top-selling album of 1986, and the 27th top-selling album of 1987. It was named the 14th top-selling album of the year in The Records year-end chart for 1986.

In the United States, the album peaked at #27 in the Billboard 200 in the week of February 7, 1987.

Charts

Awards
At the Juno Awards of 1986, the album won the Juno Award for Album of the Year. "Don't Forget Me (When I'm Gone)" also won for Single of the Year, and the band won Most Promising Group. "Someday" won Single of the Year at the Juno Awards of 1987, the first time in the award's history that the same artist won the award in two consecutive years for singles from the same album.

At the Grammy Awards in 1987, the band were nominated for Best New Artist.

The band swept the Rock Express magazine reader's poll in 1987, winning Top Canadian Group, Top Canadian Album for The Thin Red Line, and Top Canadian Single for "Don't Forget Me".

Reissue
The album was remastered and reissued as a special anniversary edition double CD on June 19, 2012 by EMI Music Canada. In addition to the remastered album on the first disc, the second disc collects thirteen additional tracks including remixes, demos, single mixes, B-sides and live versions. A booklet with extensive liner notes is also included.

Track listing

Personnel

Glass Tiger
 Alan Frew – vocals
 Al Connelly – guitars
Sam Reid – keyboards
 Wayne Parker – bass
 Michael Hanson – drums, backing vocals

Additional musicians
 Additional keyboards, background vocals: Jim Vallance
 Background vocals: Marc Lafrance, Paul Janz, Bryan Adams (on "Don't Forget Me", "I Will Be There"), Dalbello, and Sharon Lee Williams
 Additional guitars: Keith Scott
 Additional bass: Doug Edwards (on "Don't Forget Me")
 Harmonica: David Pickell
 Horns: Chase Sanborn, Charles Gray, Russ Little
 Arrangements: Glass Tiger, Jim Vallance, and Gerald O'Brien

Production
 Engineering: Mike Jones, Paul Northfield, Jim Vallance, Lorne Feld, Mike Baskerville, Hayward Parrott, and Robin Brouwers
 Assistance: Randy Staub, Angelo Civiero, Robert Digioia, and Steve Ibelshauser
 Mixing: Ed Thacker and Sam Reid ("The Secret")
 Producing on "The Secret": Sam Reid
 Mastering: Bob Ludwig
 Photography: Deborah Samuel
 Design: Heather Brown
 Cover Concept Deborah Samuel and Dal Heslip
 Logo: Shoot That Tiger!

Certifications

References 

1986 debut albums
Glass Tiger albums
Capitol Records albums
Juno Award for Album of the Year albums
Albums recorded at Le Studio